Sheerness-on-Sea railway station is on the Sheerness Line in north Kent, England, and serves the town of Sheerness.

Train services are provided by Southeastern.

History

For a period up to 1973 hourly direct services to London Victoria left from platform 2. By 1978 direct services ran only in peak hours, the fastest taking 98mins to reach Victoria, slower than the fastest 81mins, and off-peak half-hourly 94 mins to London St Pancras International 35 years later, which require a change.

After the withdrawal of the Class 411 4-CEPs, services from August 1998 to December 2006 were operated by the Class 508. From the December 2006 timetable change, the two coach Class 466 were used. In 2019, in order to comply with accessibility requirements, the trains were replaced with Class 375 Electrostars, most commonly the 3-car variants.

Accidents and incidents
On 26 February 1971, a train formed of five 2HAP electric multiple units overran the buffers and demolished the station building. One person was killed and ten were injured.

Services
All services at Sheerness-on-Sea are operated by Southeastern using  EMUs.

References

External links

Sheerness
Railway stations in Swale
DfT Category E stations
Former London, Chatham and Dover Railway stations
Railway stations in Great Britain opened in 1883
Railway stations in Great Britain closed in 1914
Railway stations in Great Britain opened in 1922
Railway stations served by Southeastern